Bedyuk is a rural locality (a selo) in Richinsky Selsoviet, Agulsky District, Republic of Dagestan, Russia. The population was 305 as of 2010.

Geography 
Bedyuk is located 18 km southwest of Tpig (the district's administrative centre) by road. Richa is the nearest rural locality.

References 

Rural localities in Agulsky District